Santo Bugito is an American animated television series produced and developed by Klasky-Csupo for CBS and created by Arlene Klasky. It ran for thirteen episodes and revolved around the goings on in a fictional community of insects. The show was advertised as the first Tex-Mex cartoon.

Notable achievements of this series included a revival of the insect-community genre (little of which had been seen since Mr. Bug Goes to Town), and voice cameos from well known performers such as Jim Belushi. The regular cast included Tony Plana, William Sanderson, Henry Gibson, George Kennedy, Cheech Marin and Joan Van Ark.

Synopsis
Santo Bugito is set in a titular border town between Texas and Mexico, populated by various anthropomorphic insects. Carmen De La Antchez (Marabina Jaimes) is the show's protagonist, an ant who runs a restaurant in the town with her husband, Paco (Tony Plana). The town is populated by other insects, including two brash American flies, Clem (William Sanderson) and Burt (Michael Stanton), a hyperactive flea named Lencho (Cheech Marin), a cynical artist termite named Eaton Woode (Charles Adler), a butterfly named Rosa (Candi Milo) and her boyfriend Miguel who is still in his cocoon, Amelia (Joan Van Ark), an enthusiastic damselfly, Ralph, a large friendly ladybug with a deep voice (George Kennedy) and a praying mantis professor who occasionally interrupts the show to give dull educational lectures, but is usually pushed off-screen by another character.

The show primarily deals with slice of life stories, but often with a strange insect twist. Some episodes include the town still trying to operate when Carmen is bedridden with a broken leg ("The Carmen Tango"), Lencho trying to attract a famous black widow spider dancer to perform in the town ("A Widow Goes a Long Way"), and one where a mosquito lawyer named Emma Squito comes to town, and everyone in the town is caught up in a suing frenzy, in exchange for Emma sucking the blood from each of her clients ("Sue City"). A mariachi band of ants occasionally narrate the action with music.

Main cast 
 Marabina Jaimes - Carmen
 Tony Plana - Paco
 Charlie Adler - Eaton and Miguel
 Joan Van Ark - Amelia
 George Kennedy - Ralph
 Henry Gibson - Mothmeyer
 Candi Milo - Rosa
 David Paymer - The Professor
 William Sanderson - Clem
 Michael Stanton - Burt
 Cheech Marin - Lencho

Episodes 
Only 13 episodes were produced, and the series was canceled after only one season.
 Load o' Bees 
 Sue City 
 Splitsville 
 The Carmen Tango 
 Cupid vs. Clem 
 Swiped 
 A Widow Goes a Long Way
 The Carnivore Kid 
 Lost Cause 
 How to Eat People and Make New Friends 
 My Name Is Revenge 
 Bugged Bug 
 Buenos Roaches

References

External links

1995 American television series debuts
1996 American television series endings
CBS original programming
Fictional populated places
1990s American animated television series
American children's animated fantasy television series
Television series by Klasky Csupo
Animated television series about insects
Australian Broadcasting Corporation original programming
ITV children's television shows
Television series created by Gábor Csupó
Television series created by Arlene Klasky